Mount Damota or Mount Damot is the highest peak in Wolayita, Southern Nations, Nationalities, and Peoples' Region, Ethiopia with altitude of nearly  above the sea level. Mt. Damota area is found in Wolaita Zone between Damot Gale, Boloso Sore, and Soddo Zuria districts. Mt. Damota is a source of many streams flowing to different districts in radial pattern namely: Hamessa, Waja (river), Bisare, Gazina and other rivers.

The Damot Mountain has a historical value to the Welayta Communities. It was used as a place of coronation and burial by Wolayita kings.

References 

Mountains of Ethiopia
Mountains and hills of Wolayita Zone